Alfred Black (date of birth unknown, died 1859) was an Australian cricketer. He played two first-class cricket matches for Victoria in 1858.

See also
 List of Victoria first-class cricketers

References

Year of birth missing
1859 deaths
Australian cricketers
Victoria cricketers
Place of birth missing